John Cassidy may refer to:

 John Cassidy (artist) (1860–1939), Irish sculptor and painter
 John Cassidy (baseball) (1855–1891), American baseball player
 John Cassidy (basketball) (born 1947), Canadian Olympic basketball player
 John Cassidy (journalist) (born 1963), business journalist and published author
 John Cassidy (magician) (born 1967), American magician and balloon artist
 John Cassidy (author), American author and publishing executive
 John Cassidy (chancellor), Australian businessman and former university chancellor
 John Cassidy (seismologist) (born 1959), Canadian seismologist
 John Cassidy (speed skater) (born 1952), Canadian Olympic speed skater
 Jack Cassidy (1927–1976), American actor
 John Edward Cassidy (1896–1984), American lawyer; Illinois Attorney General
John E. Cassidy Jr (1924—2003), member of the Illinois House of Representatives. 
 John F. Cassidy, Vice Chairman of the board and former Chief Executive Officer of Cincinnati Bell Inc.
 John Joe Cassidy (died 1995), Gaelic football player for Cavan
 John P. Cassidy (1912–?), Los Angeles City Council member, 1962–1967